António José da Silva Coutinho (8 May 170518 October 1739) was a Brazilian dramatist born in colonial Brazil, known as "the Jew" (O Judeu).

Life
His parents, João Mendes da Silva and Lourença Coutinho, descended from Jews who had emigrated to the colony of Brazil to escape the Inquisition, but in 1702 that tribunal began to persecute the Marranos or anyone of Jewish descent in Rio, and in October 1712 Lourença Coutinho became a victim. Her husband and children accompanied her to Portugal when António was 7 years old, where she figured among the "reconciled" in the auto-da-fé of July 9, 1713, after undergoing the torment only.

Her husband, having then acquired a fixed domicile in Lisbon, settled down to advocacy with success, and he was able to send António to the University of Coimbra, where he matriculated in the faculty of law. In 1726 António was suddenly imprisoned along with his mother on August 8; on the 16th he suffered the first interrogation, and on September 23 he was put to the torment, with the result that three weeks later he could not sign his name. He confessed to having followed the practices of the Mosaic law, and this saved his life.

He then went through the great auto-da-fé held on October 23 in the presence of King John V and his court, abjured his errors, and was set at liberty. His mother was only released from prison in October 1729, after she had undergone torture and figured as a penitent in another auto-da-fé.

Meanwhile, António had gone back to Coimbra, and finishing his course in 1728–1729 he returned to Lisbon and became associated with his father as an advocate. He found what he believed to be an ignorant and corrupt society ruled by an immoral yet fanatical monarch, who wasted millions on unprofitable buildings though the country was almost without roads and the people had become the most backward in Europe. As his plays show, the spectacle struck António's observation, but he had to criticize with caution.

He produced his first play or opera in 1733, and the next year he married his cousin, D. Leonor Maria de Carvalho, whose parents had been burnt by the Inquisition, while she herself had gone through an auto-da-fé in Spain and been exiled on account of her religion. They had their first daughter in 1734, but the years of their marriage and of Silva's dramatic career were few, for on October 5, 1737, husband and wife were both imprisoned on the charge of "judaizing." A slave of theirs had denounced them to the Holy Office. Though the details of the accusation against them seemed trivial and contradictory, and some of his friends testified about his Catholic piety and observation, António was condemned to death. On October 18, like those who wanted to die in the Catholic faith, he was first strangled and after had his body burnt in an auto-da-fé. His wife, who witnessed his death, did not long survive him.

Legacy
Slight as his sketches are, they show considerable dramatic talent and an Aristophanic wit. The characters are well drawn and the dialogue full of comic strength, the scenes knit together and the plot skillfully worked out. Moreover, Silva possessed a knowledge of stagecraft, and, if he had lived, he might have emancipated the drama in Portugal from its dependence on foreign writers; but the triple licence of the Palace, the Ordinary and the Inquisition, which a play required, crippled spontaneity and freedom. Even so, he showed some boldness in exposing types of the prevailing charlatanism and follies, though his liberty of speech is far less than that of Gil Vicente. His comedies give a truthful and interesting picture of 18th century society, especially his best comedy, the Alecrim e Mangerona, in which he treats of the fidalgo pobre, a type fixed by Vicente and Francisco Manuel de Melo.

His works bear the title "operas" because, though written mainly in prose, they contain songs which Silva introduced in imitation of the true operas which then held the fancy of the public. He was also a lyric poet of real merit, combining correctness of form with a pretty inspiration and real feeling. His plays were published in the first two volumes of a collection entitled Theatro comico portuguez, which went through at least five editions in the 18th century, while the Alecrim e Mangerona appeared separately in some seven editions. This comedy and the Don Quixote have been reprinted in a critical edition with a life of Silva by Mendes dos Remedios (Coimbra, 1905).

Ferdinand Denis, in his Chefs-d'œuvre du théâtre portugais (pp. 365–496, Paris, 1823), prints liberal extracts, with a French translation, from the Vida de Dom Quixote, and F. Wolf likewise gives selections from Silva's various compositions. Silva is the subject also of several laudatory poems and dramas, one or two of which were composed by Brazilian compatriots.

His story was dramatized in the 1996 film The Jew.

Works
His dramatic works, which were produced at the Bairro Alto theatre between 1733 and 1738, include the following comedies, all played by marionettes:
Vida do Grande Dom Quixote de la Mancha e do Gordo Sancho Pança (1733)
Esopaida (1734)
Os Encantos de Medea (1735)
Amphitrião (May 1736)
Labyrintho de Creta (November 1736)
Guerras do Alecrim e Mangerona (carnival of 1737)
As Variedades de Proteu (May 1737), set as a marionette opera by António Teixeira.
Precipicio de Faetonte (1738)

References

Further reading 
Teófilo Braga, História do teatro português, a baixa comedia e a opera (Oporto, 1871)
F Wolf, Dom António José da Silva (Vienna, 1860)
Ernest David, Les Operas du juif António José da Silva, 1705–1739 (Paris, 1880)
Oliveira Lima, Aspectos da literatura colonial Brasileira (Leipzig, 1896)
Jewish Encyclopedia, vol. xi. p. 341.
GA Kohnt, "Bibliography of Works relating to António José da Silva and Bibliography of Don António's Compositions" in the Publ. Am. Jew. Hist. Soc. No. 4, p. 181.
idem, "Martyrs of the Inquisition in South America," ib. p. 135.
M Grunwald, "José da Silva" in Monatsschrift (1880), xxix. p. 241.

External links
Copy of the whole trial of Antonio José da Silva by the Portuguese Inquisition, in Portuguese, Pages 51-261, Revista do Instituto Histórico e Geográfico Brasileiro, LIX, part 1
Antônio José da Silva's works online
Dramatic episodes of the Portuguese Inquisition, volume 2, by Antonio Baião, in Portuguese
"The Jew", film directed by Jom Tob Azulay, on the life of Antonio José da Silva, in Portuguese

1705 births
1739 deaths
Converts to Roman Catholicism from Judaism
18th-century Portuguese dramatists and playwrights
Portuguese Roman Catholics
Brazilian Jews
Brazilian people of Portuguese-Jewish descent
Brazilian people of Portuguese descent
18th-century Brazilian people
People executed by the Portuguese Inquisition
University of Coimbra alumni
Executed Portuguese people
Executed Brazilian people
People executed by strangulation
18th-century Sephardi Jews
18th-century executions by Portugal
Victims of antisemitic violence
Baroque writers
Portuguese male dramatists and playwrights